Klimovsk is a microdistrict of Podolsk in Podolsk Urban Okrug, Moscow Oblast, Russia, located  south of Moscow and  south of Podolsk. Population:

History
Klimovsk was founded in the first half of the 19th century as a village with the name of Klimovka, which was close to the Moscow–Serpukhov–Tula road. The basic employment of the peasants was agriculture and cattle breeding.

It was renamed Klimovsk in 1883 and granted town status on October 7, 1940. The occurrence and development of Klimovsk is closely connected to the history of a machine-building factory. The Moscow–Kursk railway laid in the immediate proximity of the village has allowed a group of manufacturers in 1882 to begin here the construction of a factory for the manufacture of spare parts for the weaving looms necessary for the cotton-mills of the central provinces of Russia.

When its status as a town was abolished in 2015, it became part of the city of Podolsk. It was the only inhabited locality of the former Klimovsk Urban Okrug.

Twin towns and sister cities
Klimovsk is twinned with:
 Novocheboksarsk, Russia  
 Ihtiman, Bulgaria

References

Notes

Sources

Cities and towns in Moscow Oblast
Naukograds